Matthew Boulton (20 January 1893 – 10 February 1962) was a British stage and film character actor, who often played police officers and military officers. Having established himself in the theatre, he began taking supporting roles in films including an appearance in Alfred Hitchcock's Sabotage. He subsequently emigrated to Hollywood where he worked for the remainder of his career. His films in America include The Woman in Green (1945) and The Woman in White (1948).

Partial filmography

 To What Red Hell (1929) - Inspector Jackson
 The Man from Chicago (1930)
 Bed and Breakfast (1930) - Police Sergeant
 Third Time Lucky (1931) - Inspector
 The Flying Fool (1931) - Minor role (uncredited)
 Creeping Shadows (1931) - Inspector Potter
 Potiphar's Wife (1931) - (uncredited)
 Keepers of Youth (1931) - (uncredited)
 The 39 Steps (1935) - Fake Police Officer (uncredited)
 Bulldog Jack (1935) - Police Constable (uncredited)
 Sabotage (1936) - Superintendent Talbot
 Shall We Dance (1937) - Ship's Officer (uncredited)
 Night Must Fall (1937) - Belsize
 The Thirteenth Chair (1937) - Commissioner Grimshaw (uncredited)
 The Firefly (1937) - Wellington
 Bulldog Drummond's Revenge (1937) - Sir John Haxton (uncredited)
 Bulldog Drummond's Peril (1938) - Sir Raymond Blantyree
 Lord Jeff (1938) - Inspector Scott
 Bulldog Drummond in Africa (1938) - Major Gray
 Vacation from Love (1938) - Captain Bering (uncredited)
 A Christmas Carol (1938) - Second Charity Solicitor (uncredited)
 Bridal Suite (1939) - Ship Captain (uncredited)
 Bulldog Drummond's Bride (1939) - Blake--Fingerprint Expert (uncredited)
 The Earl of Chicago (1940) - Ickerton (uncredited)
 The Invisible Man Returns (1940) - Policeman (uncredited)
 Adventure in Diamonds (1940) - Lloyd
 Phantom Raiders (1940) - John Ramsell, Sr
 Mystery Sea Raider (1940) - Captain Howard
 Comrade X (1940) - British World Press Attendee (uncredited)
 Rage in Heaven (1941) - Ramsbotham
 They Met in Bombay (1941) - Inspector Cressney
 Dangerously They Live (1941) - Capt. Hunter (scenes deleted)
 Son of Fury: The Story of Benjamin Blake (1942) - Jury Foreman (uncredited)
 A Yank on the Burma Road (1942) - Rangoon Aide de camp
 My Favorite Blonde (1942) - Colonel Ashmont
 Tarzan's New York Adventure (1942) - Portmaster (scenes deleted)
 Counter-Espionage (1942) - Inspector J. Stephens
 The Undying Monster (1942) - Coroner (uncredited)
 Journey for Margaret (1942) - Air-Raid Warden #2 (uncredited)
 Random Harvest (1942) - Policeman (uncredited)
 Above Suspicion (1943) - Constable Jones (uncredited)
 Two Tickets to London (1943) - Brighton
 Holy Matrimony (1943) - Sergeant (uncredited)
 The White Cliffs of Dover (1944) - Immigration Officer (uncredited)
 Ministry of Fear (1944) - Official, Ministry of Home Security (uncredited)
 Secrets of Scotland Yard (1944) - Col. Hedley
 Our Hearts Were Young and Gay (1944) - Ship's Officer (uncredited)
 None but the Lonely Heart (1944) - First Police Desk Sergeant (uncredited)
 Nothing but Trouble (1944) - Prince Prentiloff
 National Velvet (1944) - Entry Official
 The Man in Half Moon Street (1945) - Det. Insp. Ned Garth
 The Brighton Strangler (1945) - Inspector Graham
 Molly and Me (1945) - Sergeant (uncredited)
 The Woman in Green (1945) - Inspector Gregson
 Incendiary Blonde (1945) - Doctor Diagnosing Tex (uncredited)
 Love Letters (1945) - Judge (uncredited)
 Kitty (1945) - Solicitor (uncredited)
 Of Human Bondage (1946) - Mr. Foreman (uncredited)
 Stallion Road (1947) - Joe Beasley
 Ivy (1947) - Tom Lumford (uncredited)
 Bulldog Drummond Strikes Back (1947) - William Cosgrove
 Unconquered (1947) - Capt. Brooks (uncredited)
 Tarzan and the Mermaids (1948) - British Inspector-General
 The Woman in White (1948) - Dr. Nevin
 Enchantment (1948) - Air Raid Warden
 The Secret Garden (1949) - Mr. Bromley
 Barbary Pirate (1949) - Tobias Sharpe
 Challenge to Lassie (1949) - Butcher (uncredited)
 Rogues of Sherwood Forest (1950) - Abbot (uncredited)
 The Racket (1951) - Simpson - Nick's Butler (uncredited)
 The Son of Dr. Jekyll (1951) - Insp. Grey (uncredited)
 Last Train from Bombay (1952) - Col. Frederick Palmer
 Loose in London (1953) - Ames (uncredited) (final film role)

References

External links 

 

1893 births
1962 deaths
British male film actors
British male stage actors
British emigrants to the United States
People from Lincoln, England
Actors from Lincoln, England
20th-century British male actors
Male actors from Lincolnshire